The 1964 Arizona Wildcats football team represented the University of Arizona in the Western Athletic Conference (WAC) during the 1964 NCAA University Division football season. In their sixth season under head coach Jim LaRue, the Wildcats compiled a 6–3–1 record (3–1 in WAC), finished in a three-way for the WAC championship, and outscored their opponents 147 to 76. Home games were played on campus at Arizona Stadium in Tucson, and the team captains were John Briscoe and Larry Fairholm.

Arizona's statistical leaders included Lou White with 419 passing yards, Floyd Hudlow with 402 rushing yards, and Rickie Harris with 391 receiving yards.

Schedule

Season notes
 Arizona shared the WAC title with both New Mexico and Utah. The combination of the head-to-head loss to the Lobos early in the season and not playing Utah contributed to the 3-way tie and prevented the Wildcats from making a bowl appearance. However, due to very few bowl games existing at the time, no bowl involved a WAC team.
 After winning against Arizona State this season, Arizona began a decade of futility against their rival, and not winning again until 1974.

References

Arizona
Arizona Wildcats football seasons
Western Athletic Conference football champion seasons
Arizona Wildcats football